Palpitea is a proposed clade of eukaryotes that are related to Archaeplastida and the SAR supergroup.

Classification
Based on studies done by Cavalier-Smith, Chao & Lewis 2015
 Subphylum Palpitia Cavalier-Smith 2012
 Class Palpitea Cavalier-Smith 2012
 Order Palpitida
 Family Palpitomonadidae
 Genus Palpitomonas Yabuki, Inagaki & Ishida 2010
 Species Palpitomonas bilix Yabuki, Inagaki & Ishida 2010

References

External links

 Tree of Life: Hacrobia

Cryptista
Taxa named by Thomas Cavalier-Smith
Monotypic eukaryote classes